Ampang is a federal constituency in Gombak District and Hulu Langat District, Selangor, Malaysia, that has been represented in the Dewan Rakyat since 2004.

The federal constituency was created in the 2003 redistribution and is mandated to return a single member to the Dewan Rakyat under the first past the post voting system.

Demographics 
雪兰莪国席 Selangor - 马来西亚第15届全国大选 | 中國報

History

Polling districts 
According to the gazette issued on 31 October 2022, the Ampang constituency has a total of 37 polling districts.

Representation history

State constituency

Current state assembly members

Local governments

Election results

References

Selangor federal constituencies